Wong Kan Seng  (born 8 September 1946) is a Singaporean former politician who served as Deputy Prime Minister of Singapore between 2005 and 2011. He has been serving as Chairman of the United Overseas Bank since 2018.

A former member of the governing People's Action Party (PAP), he was the Member of Parliament (MP) for Kuo Chuan SMC between 1984 and 1988, the Bishan East division of Thomson GRC between 1991 and 1997, and later Bishan–Toa Payoh GRC between 1997 and 2015.

During his political career, Wong had served as Minister for Community Development between 1987 and 1991, Leader of the House between 1987 and 2007, Minister for Foreign Affairs between 1988 and 1994, Minister for Home Affairs between 1994 and 2010, Deputy Prime Minister between 2005 and 2011, and Coordinating Minister for National Security between 2010 and 2011. After his resignation from the Cabinet in 2011, Wong continued to serve as a Member of Parliament (MP) on the backbenches until 2015.

Education
Wong attended Rangoon Road Primary School, Outram Secondary School and the Adult Education Board (now the Institute of Technical Education) before graduating from the University of Singapore (now the National University of Singapore) in 1970 with a Bachelor of Arts with honours degree in history and English.

Wong subsequently completed a Master of Science degree in business studies at the London Business School in 1979 under a postgraduate scholarship conferred by the Singapore Government when he was a civil servant.

Political career
Prior to entering politics, Wong had worked in both the Civil Service and the private sector. He worked in the Ministry of Labour and Ministry of Defence, before joining Hewlett Packard in 1981 as a personnel manager and left in 1985 for politics.

Wong made his political debut in the 1984 general election as a PAP contesting in Kuo Chuan SMC and won. He contested in Thomson GRC during the 1991 general election before switching to Bishan–Toa Payoh GRC in the 1997 general election.

Wong was appointed Acting Minister for Community Development in 1986. He was made a full member of the Cabinet as Minister for Community Development by Prime Minister Lee Kuan Yew in 1987. He was appointed Minister for Foreign Affairs in 1988. In 1994, he became Minister for Home Affairs. Wong had also served as Leader of the House between 1991 and 2007.

Wong was vocal in his capacity as a Cabinet minister when it comes to defending any criticisms of the PAP as being authoritarian, or that the political process was undemocratic with an advantage given to the governing party. He often described the opposition as being disorganised, weak and driven by self-interests."The public has no sympathy for them. Neither do I. Why should I? I mean, they mess it up."On opposition politician J. B. Jeyaretnam's proposal to establish an independent elections commission, Wong remarked, "It is absurd. I think we cannot be more democratic than we are now. We even allow a loser to be in Parliament and make speeches attacking the government. Where could you find such a democracy in other countries?"

During the World Conference on Human Rights held in 1993, Wong argued that democracy was interpreted differently in Singapore. He claims that its citizens "do not agree that pornography is an acceptable manifestation of free expression or that homosexual relationships are just a matter of lifestyle choice." Wong also believe that excessive emphasis on individual rights over the rights of the community will retard progress.

On 1 September 2005, Wong was appointed Deputy Prime Minister by Prime Minister Lee Hsien Loong, following the retirement of Tony Tan. On 1 November 2010, Wong was appointed Coordinating Minister for National Security and relinquished his Minister for Home Affairs portfolio.

Wong retired from the Cabinet following the 2011 general election. He remains a Member of Parliament and also the special adviser for economic cooperation to Prime Minister Lee Hsien Loong until 11 September 2015, when he was finally retired from politics after 31 years.

Role in the homeland security in Singapore
As Minister for Home Affairs, Wong was in charge of overseeing emergency planning, dealing with internal threats such as cults and terrorists, involved in law and order, and rooting out of criminals and illegal immigrants.

Mas Selamat escape
On 27 February 2008, alleged Jemaah Islamiyah leader Mas Selamat bin Kastari escaped from Whitley Road Detention Centre, leading to the largest manhunt in Singapore. Wong expressed his regret in Parliament the day after the occurrence.

"This should never have happened. I am sorry that it has."

He revealed that Mas Selamat escaped when he was taken to the toilet before a meeting at the detention centre's family visit room.

Wong was criticised because news of Mas Selamat's escape was not disseminated to the public until four hours after its occurrence. There were calls for Wong to step down, given the severity of the security lapse. Mas Selamat was eventually recaptured in Johor Bahru, Malaysia, on 1 April 2009, by Malaysian authorities, over a year after his escape.

2003 SARS outbreak
Wong was then responsible for co-ordinating the inter-ministerial nationwide effort to counter the SARS epidemic.

Certain measures were taken to contain the virus, including mandatory home quarantine measures, health screening at immigration checkpoints, schools and hospitals and public education programs. On 31 May 2003, Singapore was taken off the World Health Organization's list of SARS-affected countries.

Professional career
Wong returned to the private sector after stepping down from the Cabinet.

Wong was appointed Chairman of Singbridge International, a Temasek Holdings unit dealing with the Sino-Singapore Guangzhou Knowledge City, in 2011.

Wong was appointed Non-Executive and Independent Director on the Board of Directors at the United Overseas Bank (UOB) in 2017 and was subsequently appointed Chairman in 2018. He is also holding the positions of Chairman of the Executive Committee and Member of the Board Risk Management Committee, Nominating Committee and Remuneration and Human Capital Committee at UOB.

Personal life
Wong is married to Ruth Lee Hong Geok and they have two children.

References

External links
 Official website of Wong Kan Seng
 Wong Kan Seng at parliament.gov.sg

Members of the Cabinet of Singapore
Members of the Parliament of Singapore
People's Action Party politicians
Singaporean politicians of Chinese descent
Singaporean people of Cantonese descent
Alumni of London Business School
1946 births
Living people
University of Singapore alumni
Ministers for Foreign Affairs of Singapore
Ministers for Home Affairs of Singapore